KBUX (96.5 FM) is an Oldies, Classic hits, and Adult standards formatted broadcast radio station licensed to and serving Quartzsite, Arizona.  KBUX is owned and operated by Marvin D. Vosper.

Broadcasting, studio, and offices location: 1010 W. Camel St., Quartzsite, AZ 85346.

References

External links
 KBUX Radio 96.5 FM official website

BUX
Oldies radio stations in the United States
Adult standards radio stations in the United States
Radio stations established in 1988
La Paz County, Arizona
1988 establishments in Arizona